This is a list of properties and districts in Harris County, Georgia that are listed on the National Register of Historic Places (NRHP).

Current listings

|}

References

Harris
Buildings and structures in Harris County, Georgia